Plant man or variation, may refer to:

People
 Plantsman or plantman, a plant nursery worker
 Gardener or plant man
 Horticulturalist or plant man
 Botanist or plant man
 Factory worker or plant man, a worker at a plant

Persons
 A man by the name of "Plant"
 Greg Morton (born 1953), U.S. American football player with a horticultural passion leading to the nickname "Plant Man"
 Gary Young (drummer) (born 1953), U.S. musician with the stagename "Plantman"

Characters
 Plantman, a Marvel Comics character
 Plant Man, a character from Mega Man; see List of Mega Man characters
 Plant Man, a character from the TV cartoon Frankenstein Jr. and The Impossibles

Other uses
 The Plantsman, a horticultural magazine
 "The Plant Man" (episode), a 1966 season 3 number 12 episode 70 of Voyage to the Bottom of the Sea (TV series)
 "Plant Man", a 2008 episode of The Marvelous Misadventures of Flapjack; see List of The Marvelous Misadventures of Flapjack episodes

See also

 Plant (disambiguation)
 Man (disambiguation)